Denison Township is a township in Crawford County, Iowa, USA.  As of the 2000 census, its population was 7,757.

Geography
According to the USGS, it contains five cemeteries: Crawford County Home, Crawford Heights Memorial, Oakland, Saint Rose of Lima and Zion.

The streams of Coon Creek, East Boyer River and Willow Creek run through this township.

Transportation
Denison Township contains one airport, Denison Municipal Airport.

References
 USGS Geographic Names Information System (GNIS)

External links
 US-Counties.com
 City-Data.com

Townships in Crawford County, Iowa
Townships in Iowa